Colias wanda is a butterfly in the family Pieridae. It is found in the eastern Palearctic realm (northern China).

Subspecies
Colias wanda wanda
Colias wanda paskoi Kocman, 1999
Colias wanda yangguifei Huang & Murayama, 1992

Taxonomy
It was accepted as a species by Josef Grieshuber and Gerardo Lamas, but it may be a subspecies of Colias arida Alphéraky, 1889

References

External links
J. Fuchs
Colias wanda images at Consortium for the Barcode of Life 
Colias wanda paskoi images at Bold
Colias wanda wanda images at Bold

Butterflies described in 1907
wanda